Directorate of Prosecution is the prosecuting agency of Government of Kerala, and under administrative control of Department of Home, Government of Kerala. The key function of the Directorate is to streamline the conduct of prosecution, for and on behalf of the State, before the Courts and to monitor and supervise the Prosecutors working in various sub-ordinate Courts in the State. The key responsibility of the Directorate is to supervise and streamline the work of prosecution machinery of the state. The Directorate of Prosecution is headed by the Director General of Prosecution, The DGP is assisted by Director of Prosecution, Deputy Directors of Prosecution, Assistant Directors of Prosecution and Public Prosecutors. The Directorate of Prosecution is headquartered in Ernakulam, the judicial capital of Kerala.

T.A. Shaji is the current Director General of Prosecution of kerala.

Overview 
The Directorate of Prosecution is established in 2000 and it is headed by the Director General of Prosecution. He is assisted by a Director of Prosecution (Admn). The directorate is under administrative control of the Department of Home. the Department of Home is headed by the Additional Chief Secretary (Home).

organizational structure
 Additional Chief Secretary (Home & Vigilance)
 Director General of Prosecution (DGP) [Head of the department and also State Public Prosecutor]
 Director of Prosecution (Administration)
 Deputy Director of Prosecution and District Public Prosecutor and Government Pleader
 Public Prosecutor and Government Pleader
 Assistant Public Prosecutor and Government Pleader

See also 

 Advocate general (India)
 Advocate general
 Department of Home (Kerala)

References

Government of Kerala